was a district located in Gifu Prefecture, Japan.

As of 2003, the district had an estimated population of 48,776 and a density of 68.95 persons per km2. The total area was 707.36 km2.

Mergers
 On October 25, 2004 - the towns of Akechi, Iwamura, Kamiyahagi and Yamaoka, and the village of Kushihara were merged into the expanded city of Ena. 
 On February 13, 2005 - the towns of Fukuoka, Sakashita and Tsukechi, and the villages of Hirukawa, Kashimo and Kawaue, along with the village of Yamaguchi (from Kiso District, Nagano Prefecture), were merged into the expanded city of Nakatsugawa .

References

Former districts of Gifu Prefecture